Funny Story is a 2018 tragicomedy film, directed by Michael J. Gallagher and co-written by Gallagher and Steve Greene. It stars Matthew Glave, Emily Bett Rickards and Jana Winternitz. The film premiered as an official selection at the 2018 Slamdance Film Festival on January 21, 2018.

Plot
Aging TV star Walter Campbell's (Matthew Glave) attempts to break up with younger girlfriend Lucy (Daisye Tutor) are thwarted by the announcement of her pregnancy. Looking for space, Walter resolves to visit his estranged daughter Nic (Jana Winternitz), currently residing in Big Sur, resentful of her father's neglectful parenting and womanizing ways. He agrees to give a lift to Nic's friend Kim (Emily Bett Rickards), who having recently attended the funeral of her estranged mother, is dealing with her own emotional baggage.

Upon arriving in Big Sur, Walter discovers that Nic is living on a lesbian commune, and is in fact due to get married. Nic is appreciative of Walter's acceptance of her sexuality, which sees the pair's relationship begin to repair, but this newly formed bond is at risk of being destroyed once and for all.

Cast

 Matthew Glave as Walter Campbell
 Emily Bett Rickards as Kim  
 Jana Winternitz as Nic
 Nikki Limo as Brian
 Lily Holleman as Moon
 Jessica Diggins as Paula
 Aschleigh Jensen as Tamara
 Pete Gardner as Jack
 Jacob Wysocki as Tyler
 Daisye Tutor as Lucy 
 Reginald VelJohnson as Hank
 Ceciley Jenkins as Mrs Butterwen
 Jamie Costa as a Waiter
 Jason Horton as Moderator

Co-writer Steve Greene appears in a cameo during the film, dressed as an alien centaur, during scenes featuring the character of Walter's fictional television series.

Production

Development

Gallagher and writing partner Steve Green began developing the project in 2015. Having previously worked heavily on genre-based projects, the pair wanted to develop a fictional story that drew more deeply upon the experiences and feelings of themselves and of people in their lives. Talking about his motivations for developing the film, Gallagher stated "I wanted to make a film about forgiveness. Can we forgive someone who has truly wronged us? Or is their wrong doing just a matter of our myopic perspective? ..... I wanted to tell a grown-up story about people who behave in childish ways."

Initially struggling to find a production company willing to finance the film, by 2017 the success of Gallagher and Winterniz's production company Cinemand enabled them to finance the feature independently.

Casting
The part of Nic was specifically written with Winternitz in mind. On casting Glave, Gallagher noted that it took some time to find the right actor for the part of Walter and that he was looking for "someone who could be charming, oblivious, deeply narcissistic-- but deep down have a good heart". With regard to casting Rickards as Kim, he stated "I knew that by casting Emily, when Kim made tough choices, the audience could see that deep down she is a good person who is just lost at this moment in time."

Filming
Filming took place in Los Angeles, California, in June 2017 and on location at Topanga Canyon and Big Sur. The film was shot in its entirety over 15 days. Director Gallagher took the decision to shoot the whole film with a wide-angle lens, something he believed benefited the comedic nature of the film and showcased the actors' interactions, as it was "fun to let them breathe and experience the awkwardness of being stuck in this shot together."

Release
The film premiered as an official selection at the 2018 Slamdance Film Festival, as part of the festival's 'Beyond Program', with director Gallagher and the cast in attendance. The film was the runner-up in the festival's Audience Award for Beyond Feature.

The film was also featured as a special presentation at the San Luis Obispo International Film Festival, and was an official selection at the Omaha Film Festival, the Sonoma International Film Festival, where it was awarded the Stolman Audience Award for Best American Indie, the OUT Shine Festival in Miami and the Vero Beach Wine and Film Festival in Florida, where the film won the Audience Award for Best Narrative Feature. It made its European premiere at the Lucca Film Festival in Italy, in April 2018 and was an official selection at the Santorini Film Festival in Greece in June 2018, where it won Best Feature Film. It was also awarded the Grand Jury Prize for Narrative Feature at the Barcelona Film Festival. The film premiered in New York in July 2018 as an official selection at the Stony Brook Film Festival and premiered in New England in the same month as an official selection at the Woods Hole Film Festival where it won the Jury Prize for Best Narrative Feature, Comedy. In August, the film screened as an official selection at the 2018 Rhode Island International Film Festival where it won first prize in the Alternative Spirit Award (Feature) category.

The film made its Canadian premiere at the Cinéfest Sudbury International Film Festival in Ontario in September 2018 and premiered in the UK at the Southampton International Film Festival in October 2018, where it won the award for Best Feature Screenplay and Best Actor for Matthew Glave. In October of the same year, it featured as the opening film at the Evolution Mallorca International Film Festival.

The film went on a limited theatrical release on May 24, 2019, and was made available for digital download from the same date.

Reception
The film garnered mainly positive reviews following its film festival screenings. Danielle Solzman of Cultured Vultures noted the strong ensemble of female characters in the film, and in particular felt Rickards delivered "the performance of a lifetime". Stephen Saito of The Movable Feast praised the command of language in Gallagher and Greene's script, as well as the performances of Glave and Rickards, noting how both "impressively toe the line between blustery self-regard and the vulnerability it hides as Walter and Kim". Writing for Film Threat, Anthony Ray Bench praised the cast's performances, in particular those of Glave and Rickards, citing the film's "dry sense of humor that the actors execute perfectly". However, he was disappointed with the film's ending, and felt that it "set itself up for so much potential drama,...and instead it all just sort of peters out". Mark Kelly of Cinemaslice praised the character development throughout the movie, and how this made "the plot twists and heavy emotional moments later on in the film feel that much more impactful". Luca Ciccioni of Anonima Cinefili praised Gallagher's accomplished filming, photography and editing. Writing for the Great Lakes-based magazine The Review, Robert E Martin described the film as being "Filled with memorable characters and top-notch performances".

Metacritic, using a weighted average, gave the film 57/100 based on five reviews, summarized as a mixed or average rating.

Awards and nominations

References

External links
 
 

American comedy-drama films
2010s English-language films
Films directed by Michael J. Gallagher
2010s American films